Álvaro Carolino Nascimento (born 7 April 1951 – 10 August 2001), known as Carolino, was a Portuguese football central defender and manager.

Playing career
Born in Palmela, Setúbal District, Carolino amassed Primeira Liga totals of 149 games and one goal during eight seasons, with C.D. Montijo, Boavista F.C. and Académica de Coimbra. His best output in the competition occurred in 1975–76, when he only missed one match to help the second club finish in second position, two points behind champions S.L. Benfica.

Carolino earned two caps for Portugal, his debut coming on 19 November 1975 as he came on as a 48th-minute substitute in a 1–1 home draw against England for the UEFA Euro 1976 qualifiers.

Coaching career
Carolino worked as a manager for nearly 20 years. In the top flight, he worked with Boavista, S.C. Espinho and Académico de Viseu FC.

Death
Carolino died on 10 August 2001 at the age of 50, due to pulmonary complications. Later that day, Boavista paid tribute to him by observing a one-minute silence at the Estádio do Bessa in a match against S.C. Beira-Mar.

Honours
Taça de Portugal: 1974–75, 1975–76, 1978–79
Supertaça Cândido de Oliveira: 1979

References

External links

1951 births
2001 deaths
Portuguese footballers
Association football defenders
Primeira Liga players
Liga Portugal 2 players
C.D. Pinhalnovense players
C.D. Montijo players
Boavista F.C. players
Associação Académica de Coimbra – O.A.F. players
Portugal youth international footballers
Portugal international footballers
Portuguese football managers
Primeira Liga managers
Boavista F.C. managers
G.D. Chaves managers
C.D. Nacional managers
S.C. Olhanense managers
Académico de Viseu F.C. managers
C.D. Feirense managers
S.C. Campomaiorense managers
Varzim S.C. managers
F.C. Maia managers
Leixões S.C. managers
S.C. Beira-Mar managers
Sportspeople from Setúbal District